Session One is an album released by The Herbaliser on 26 May 2000. While the band had been together since the mid-1990s, contributing to and promoting Herbaliser's largely electronically produced albums, this was the first studio album recorded with a live band released under the group name The Herbaliser Band.

Each track is a live representation of a track from the first three Herbaliser albums, Remedies, Blow Your Headphones and Very Mercenary. Most tracks are completely instrumental, and vocals are only present in sample form on two tracks ("Who's the Realest?" and "The Sensual Woman").

The music mixes jazz, funk and hip hop with a classic big band sound.

Track listing 
 "Who's the Realest?"
 "Ginger Jumps The Fence"	  	 
 "Shocka Zulu" 	  	 
 "Shattered Soul" 	  	 
 "The Sensual Woman" 	  	 
 "The Missing Suitcase" 	  	 
 "Goldrush" 	  	 
 "Forty Winks"

Credits 
The Herbaliser Band draws on the talents of a number of instrumentalists:

 Jake Wherry – Bass guitar
 Ollie Teeba – Turntables
 Mickey Moody – Drums
 Kaidi Tatham – Keyboards (ARP Pro Soloist, Hohner Clavinet D6, Korg Trinity, Fender Rhodes 73)
 Ralph Lamb – Trumpet, flugelhorn, additional keyboards
 Patrick Dawes – Percussion
 Andy Ross – Piccolo, flute, baritone and tenor saxophone
 Chris Bowden – Alto saxophone
 Matt Coleman – Trombone

See also 
Remedies, by The Herbaliser
Stampede, by The Quantic Soul Orchestra
Man with a Movie Camera, by The Cinematic Orchestra

References

External links 

Ninjatune release discography

The Herbaliser albums
2000 live albums